72F fusion protein vaccine is a candidate tuberculosis vaccine created by Statens Serum Institut (SSI). The 72F fusion protein is composed of the Rv0125 and Rv1196 proteins derived from Mycobacterium tuberculosis.  Phase I clinical trials were completed in 2005 and Phase II trials are awaited.

See also
 Fusion protein

References
 

Tuberculosis vaccines
Protein subunit vaccines